The 1979–80 season was the 20th season of the European Cup Winners' Cup, a football tournament organised by UEFA for the cup winners from each of its member associations. The competition was won by Spanish club Valencia, who beat Arsenal of England on penalties after a goalless final at the Heysel Stadium in Brussels, Belgium. It was the only Cup Winners' Cup to be decided on penalties (although two previous finals had required replays). It was Valencia's third European title, adding to the two Inter-Cities Fairs Cup titles they won in the 1960s.

Preliminary round

|}

First round

|}

First leg

Second leg

Steaua București won 8–2 on aggregate.

Juventus won 3–2 on aggregate.

Second round

|}

First leg

Second leg

Juventus won 3–1 on aggregate.

Quarter-finals

|}

First leg

Second leg

Juventus won 2–0 on aggregate.

Semi-finals

|}

First leg

Second leg

Arsenal won 2–1 on aggregate.

Final

See also
1979–80 European Cup
1979–80 UEFA Cup

External links
 1979-80 competition at UEFA website
 Cup Winners' Cup results at Rec.Sport.Soccer Statistics Foundation
 Cup Winners Cup Seasons 1979-80–results, protocols
 website Football Archive 1979–80 Cup Winners Cup

3
UEFA Cup Winners' Cup seasons